Oh Seong-dae (Hangul: 오성대, Hanja: 吳城垈; born November 18, 1982) is a South Korean webtoon artist. He is best known for creating a horror thriller anthology webtoon Tales of the Unusual, which has become popular and received mainstream attention from Korean and global readers.

Life and career
Oh Seong-dae was born on November 18, 1982 in Seoul, South Korea. He developed a love of drawing when he was in elementary school. He graduated from Seoul National University of Science and Technology. He also studied subjects about art and design. He started working as a designer, but he quit shortly afterward. Seong-dae went into webtoon as he participated in a comic competition held by Naver, which gave him the chance to debut.

From October 2009 to November 2010, Author J was released on Naver WEBTOON follows an eponymous deceased novelist whose consciousness has been transferred into an AI algorithm and encased within the computer. From April 2011 to August 2012, Bonbon au Chocolat was released on Naver WEBTOON is about a funny love story between two middle school students, and from July to August 2012, The Cliff was also released on Naver WEBTOON revolves around two men who go hiking in the woods then accidentally fall and trapped at the edge of a cliff, while waiting for someone to save their lives, the tensions between two of them begin to rise and slowly descend into madness.

On May 8, 2013, Seong-dae created an anthology webtoon Tales of the Unusual, and published it on Naver WEBTOON. Compared to previous webtoons, Tales of the Unusual contains horror and thriller genres, with elements of supernatural, psychological, suspense, mystery, satire, black comedy, drama, science fiction, and dark-modern fantasy. For its artwork and aesthetic, Seong-dae opted for a monochromatic black and white, grayscale, with muted and darker colors rather than utilizing mild primary colors in contrast to its previous works.

Seong-dae described Tales of the Unusual as "strange", "unusual", "thrilling", and "mysterious", often with more darker tone than its previous webtoons. Its consisting of standalone, self-contained short stories follows characters (or recurring characters from previous webtoons) through their experiences a strange and unusual events. Some plot elements of each story details with different topics such as real-life events, social issues, viral phenomenon, urban legends, and paranormal events, and often usually involve bizarre and supernatural occurrences with an unusual and unexpected twist.

Seong-dae cited influences in Tales of the Unusual was inspired by the works of Junji Ito, Stephen King, Neil Gaiman, R. L. Stine, Franz Kafka and Haruki Murakami; as well as korean horror films; an anthology television series, such as The Twilight Zone, Goosebumps, The X-Files, and Black Mirror; and films directed by Jason Blum, M. Night Shyamalan, Darren Aronofsky, Stanley Kubrick, David Lynch, and Alfred Hitchcock.

In June 2013, an anthology film Horror Stories 2 was released on June 5, 2013. One of the stories is adapted from The Cliff.

From July to August 2014, The Cliff received English and Chinese translations by WEBTOON. On July 1, 2014, Tales of the Unusual also received an official English translation by WEBTOON. Since then, Tales of the Unusual received mainstream attention from Korean and global readers, making it the most popular webtoon on the WEBTOON platform.

From November to December 2013, My Wife's Memories was released on Naver WEBTOON follows a middle-aged man who experiences a ghostly vision based on memories of his deceased wife after she passes away in a tragic accident. In August 2014, Sina Weibo user Yaoyaoxiaojing translated My Wife's Memories into Chinese and posted it on her Weibo. 550,000 people had shared the comic just after two days she had posted it, making it an instant hit among the Chinese community, and bringing Seong-dae much fame.

On October 11, 2014, Tales of the Unusual received an official Chinese translation by WEBTOON and Dongman Manhua. On November 18, 2014, Tales of the Unusual also received an official Thai translation by WEBTOON. On April 20, 2015, Tales of the Unusual also received an official Indonesian translation by WEBTOON.

On February 10 – 15, 2015, Seong-dae attended the Taipei International Comics and Animation Festival along with fellow webtoon artist massstar. Both of them hosted autograph sessions for their fans in the booth of WEBTOON.

From February to April 2015, Beauty Water was also released on Naver WEBTOON revolves around a young woman who gains her perfect beauty by using a cosmetic liquid product that can allow people to reshape their looks just as well as plastic surgery. When she becomes addicted to the product until she discovers terrifying side effects that begin to affect her. In June 2015, Sina Weibo user Hanmansimida translated Beauty Water into Chinese and posted it on her Weibo. As the story touched on contemporary social issues, it was quickly viewed by over 1,000,000 people, making it an instant hit among the Chinese community and raising Seong-dae's profile in China once more. After knowing this, Seong-dae thanked the Chinese readers on Facebook in Chinese.

On October 1 – 5, 2015, Seong-dae attended and gave autographs to his fans with fellow webtoon artists Jo Seok, Son Je-ho, and Lee Kwang-soo at China International Comic Festival EXPO. On October 19, 2015, WEBTOON released a promotional animated trailer for Tales of the Unusual, produced by an animation studio, Delpic Design Studio.

On December 18, 2015, Seong-dae won a "Webtoonist of the Year" for his webtoon, Tales of the Unusual on WEBTOON's Webtoonist Day. On June 9 – 10, 2016, Seong-dae also attended and gave autographs to his fans in the booth of WEBTOON at Beijing Comic-Con along with fellow webtoon artist Jo Seok.

In 2017, the Japanese television series Yo nimo Kimyō na Monogatari was released. One of the episodes is adapted from My Wife's Memories.

In 2018, a print version of Tales of the Unusual was released on June 15, 2018 by Sodam Books. On February 21, 2019, an animated short series based on Tales of the Unusual was released on the Naver WEBTOON YouTube Channel. Each 20 episodes is adapted from 13 short stories, including The Dream-sharing Stone, The Hole, The Chatroom, The Teleporter, A Mysterious Package, The Pet Wig, Jayce's Pen, The Ghost Polaroids, Hair, 14K, Scene Box, Insomnia, and The Mole Stitcher.

On September 18, 2019, Seong-dae announced that Tales of the Unusual is going on hiatus to be renewed for a second season after the first season concluded. After 8 months of hiatus, the series was resumed on May 20, 2020. On October 25, 2020, an English version of Tales of the Unusual was also resumed after 11 months of hiatus.

In 2020, an animated film adaptation of Beauty Water was produced by a South Korean animation studio, Studio Animal. After debuting at several international film festivals, it was released on September 9, 2020, in Taiwan, Singapore, Hong Kong, Australia, and New Zealand. Despite the story's popularity among Chinese readers, due to souring Korea-China relations after the former deployed the THAAD missile defense system, no Chinese investors would support the film and it was not released in China.

On November 3, 2020, Seong-dae won "Today's Our Manhwa Award" for his webtoon, Tales of the Unusual by the Ministry of Culture, Sports and Tourism.

Works

Series and One-shots

Author J (October 2009 – November 2010, 48 episodes)
Bonbon au Chocolat (April 2011 – August 2012, 69 episodes)
The Cliff (July – August 2012, 9 episodes)
Bunker Man (September 2012)
Tales of the Unusual (May 2013 – June 2022, 94 stories)
The Ghost in the Celling (June 2013)
S.O.S (July 2015)
Shadow Makeover (August 2019)

Tales of the Unusual

Season 1 (May 8, 2013 – September 18, 2019)

The Gallery of the Damned (May 15 – July 17, 2013, 10 episodes)
An African Incident (July 24 – August 28, 2013, 6 episodes)
To Kill a Magician (September 4 – October 9, 2013, 6 episodes)
The Reset Elevator (October 23 – November 13, 2013, 4 episodes)
My Wife's Memories (November 20 – December 25, 2013, 6 episodes)
Camping (January 8 – 15, 2014, 2 episodes)
A Mysterious Package (January 22 – February 12, 2014, 4 episodes)
The Mysterious Potter (February 19 – March 12, 2014, 4 episodes)
Winning Numbers (March 26 – April 30, 2014, 6 episodes)
Ghost Hunting (May 21 – June 16, 2014, 5 episodes)
The Painting (October 15 – 22, 2014, 2 episodes)
Evolving Reincarnation (October 29 – December 17, 2014, 8 episodes)
The Chat Room (December 31, 2014)
Murderous Rage (January 7 – 21, 2015, 3 episodes)
Lex Talionis (January 28, 2015)
Beauty Water (February 4 – April 22, 2015, 11 episodes)
Growth Water (May 6, 2015)
The Man and the Dog (May 13 – July 1, 2015, 8 episodes)
The Dream-sharing Stone (July 8 – 29 2015, 4 episodes)
Regeneration Seed (August 12 – 26 2015, 3 episodes)
The Ghost App (September 2, 2015)
The Ghost Polaroids (September 9 – 16, 2015, 2 episodes)
Jayce's Pen (September 23 – October 21, 2015, 4 episodes)
Insomnia (October 29, 2015)
The Break-In (November 4 – 11, 2015, 2 episodes)
Lucidity Controller (November 25 – December 23, 2015, 5 episodes)
Earth Warrior Taletron (December 30, 2015 – January 20, 2016, 4 episodes)
Bone Dice (January 27 – February 17, 2016, 4 episodes)
Kiveiru's Library (May 14 – June 22, 2016, 8 episodes)
Real Implant (June 29, 2016)
Revenge (July 6, 2016)
Drawings (July 14 – 20, 2016, 2 episodes)
Lurker (August 3 – 24, 2016, 4 episodes)
The Pet Wig (August 31 – September 7, 2016, 3 episodes)
The Future Spirit (September 21 – November 23, 2016, 10 episodes)
The Teleporter (November 30 – December 21, 2016, 4 episodes)
Demonic Bloodweed (December 28, 2016 – January 11, 2017, 3 episodes)
Mini-Me (January 18 – 25, 2017, 2 episodes)
Ghost Home Care (February 1 – 8, 2017, 2 episodes)
The Package (February 15 – 22, 2017, 2 episodes)
Eternal Life Pills (March 1 – May 10, 2017, 11 episodes)
A Special Meal (May 17 – 24, 2017, 2 episodes)
Soul Trapping (May 31 – June 21, 2017, 4 episodes)
The Hole (June 28 – July 5, 2017, 2 episodes)
Ghost Design (July 12 – 19, 2017 2 episodes)
Gold Motel (July 26 – August 16, 2017, 4 episodes)
14K (August 30 – October 4, 2017, 6 episodes)
The Bug (October 11 – 18, 2017, 2 episodes)
The Mole Stitcher (October 25 – December 6, 2017, 7 episodes)
Scene Box (December 13, 2017 – January 3, 2018, 4 episodes)
Hair (January 10 – 24, 2018, 3 episodes)
More Days (January 31 – February 14, 2018, 3 episodes)
The Carbonated Virus (February 21 – 28, 2018, 2 episodes)
Confinement (March 7 – 21, 2018, 3 episodes)
The Tournament (June 6 – 13, 2018, 2 episodes)
The Unusual Hospital (June 20 – 27, 2018, 2 episodes)
Growth Mountains (July 4 – 18, 2018, 3 episodes)
The Human Door (July 25 – September 5, 2018, 7 episodes)
Friends (September 12 – 19, 2018, 2 episodes)
Watermelon (October 3 – 10, 2018, 2 episodes)
Brain Contamination (October 17 – November 7, 2018, 4 episodes)
Change (November 14 – 21, 2018, 2 episodes)
A Boy and a Murderer (November 28, 2018 – January 9, 2019, 7 episodes)
Acc Plants (January 23 – February 27, 2019, 6 episodes)
The Stationery Store (March 6 – 13, 2019, 2 episodes)
Magnet (March 20 – April 24, 2019, 5 episodes)
Makeover (May 1 – 22, 2019, 4 episodes)
Cafe (June 5 – 12, 2019, 2 episodes)
Head (June 19 – July 17, 2019, 5 episodes)
VR (July 24 – 31, 2019, 2 episodes)
Karaoke and an Odeng Truck (August 7 – 14, 2019, 2 episodes)
Thief (August 21 – September 11, 2019, 4 episodes)

Season 2 (May 20, 2020 – June 1, 2022)

New Beauty Water (May 20 – August 5, 2020, 12 episodes)
Game (August 12 – September 2, 2020, 4 episodes)
Black Fog (September 9 – 23, 2020, 3 episodes)
The Gym of the Damned (September 30 – October 21, 2020, 4 episodes)
Grim Reaper (October 28 – November 18, 2020, 4 episodes)
Living Doll (November 24 – December 16, 2020, 4 episodes)
Brain (December 23 – 30, 2020, 2 episodes)
A Webtoonist's Dream (January 6 – 20, 2021, 3 episodes)
Hypnosis (January 27 – February 17, 2021, 4 episodes)
Queen of Anesthesia (February 24 – March 24, 2021, 5 episodes)
Fever (April 7 – 14, 2021, 2 episodes)
The Demon Man (April 21 – May 12, 2021, 4 episodes)
Expiring City (May 19 – July 21, 2021, 9 episodes)
Devil's Eyes (July 28 – August 19, 2021, 4 episodes)
Oil Bug Diet (September 1 – 15, 2021, 3 episodes)
In a Rut (September 22 – October 6, 2021, 3 episodes)
Switch (October 13 – 27, 2021, 3 episodes)
Paper Prison (November 3, 2021 – December 22, 2021, 8 episodes)
Dating a Ghost (January 5 – 19, 2022, 3 episodes)
Random Injection (January 26 – February 2, 2022, 2 episodes)
Shell (February 9 – March 9, 2022, 5 episodes)
Winter Tree (March 16 – May 25, 2022, 11 episodes)

Adaptations
Horror Stories 2 (2013)
Yo nimo Kimyō na Monogatari (2017)
Tales of the Unusual (2019)
Beauty Water (2020)

References

External links
 Oh Seong-dae's Facebook account
 Author J - Naver WEBTOON
 Bonbon au Chocolat - Naver WEBTOON
 The Cliff - Naver WEBTOON
 Tales of the Unusual - Naver WEBTOON
The Cliff - WEBTOON
Tales of the Unusual - WEBTOON
 The Cliff - WEBTOON
 Tales of the Unusual - WEBTOON

1982 births
Living people
South Korean manhwa artists
South Korean webtoon creators
Weird fiction writers